Lucas Gómez (born 11 August 1995) is a Mexican professional tennis player.

Gómez has a career high ATP singles ranking of World No. 463, achieved on 4 April 2016. He also has a career high ATP doubles ranking of World No. 526 achieved on 16 July 2018. Gómez made his ATP main draw debut at the 2016 Abierto Mexicano Telcel, where he received a wildcard into the singles draw. Playing for Mexico in Davis Cup, Gómez has a career win–loss ratio of 0–3.

ATP Challenger and ITF Futures finals

Singles: 3 (0–3)

Doubles: 9 (3–6)

Notes

External links

1995 births
Living people
Mexican male tennis players
Sportspeople from Tijuana
21st-century Mexican people